Bobby Nunn (born 1952) is an American R&B music producer, songwriter and vocalist, best known for his top 15 US Billboard R&B chart hit single, "She's Just a Groupie".

Life and career

Early years
He was born in Buffalo, New York, United States. As a teenager, Nunn honed his writing, producing, singing, musician, and engineering skills at MoDo Records. The MoDo studio was located in the basement of the Nunn family home. Bobby with childhood friend Gene Coplin, was half of the MoDo duo known as Bob & Gene recorded tunes for the Nunn family label, Mo Do Records. Bob and Gene's songs were featured in the films Tyler Perry's Why Did I Get Married Too, Our Family Wedding and Different from Whom? In 2011, Bob and Gene were inducted into the Buffalo Music Hall of Fame.

Nunn's big opportunity came through his association with Rick James. Nunn played keyboards and sang background vocals on some of James's early Motown recordings. Those recordings included the single, "You and I" and a most of the tracks on James' Come Get It! and Bustin' Out of L Seven albums.

1980s
After settling in L.A., Nunn worked with Earth, Wind & Fire's Philip Bailey on the Splendor album that featured him and his brother Billy Nunn, who co-wrote "Mary Jane" with Rick and "Splendor" for Columbia Records.

As a solo artist, Bobby Nunn co-produced his 1982 debut Motown album Second to Nunn, with Winston Monseque. He wrote or co-wrote all but one of the tracks. The album was successful, peaking No. 148 on the Billboard 200 album chart. The lead single, "She's Just a Groupie" was also successful and peaked at No. 15 on Billboard′s R&B singles chart. On the US Dance chart, the song went to No. 28. The chorus from "She's Just a Groupie" was used as the chorus on Snoop Dogg's song "Groupie" from his double platinum album, Tha Doggfather. It was sung by Charlie Wilson.

Bobby performed on American Bandstand, Soul Train, Thicke of the Night and other shows during that time. Nunn's 1983 follow-up album, Private Party, despite some favorable reviews, failed to equal the success of his first release. His single "Don't Knock It (Until You Try It)" (on Motown TMG 1323) peaked at No. 65 on the UK Singles Chart in February 1984. The album also spawned a club favorite, "Hangin' Out at the Mall" which featured Tata Vega. Nunn's third album titled Fresh recorded in 1984, was never released.

After leaving Motown, Nunn spent time working as a writer/producer for many artists and labels. Among them were "Long Distant Love" and "Welcome to the Club", produced by Nile Rodgers for Philip Bailey's Inside Out album. He also wrote the hit single "Thank You" for Bailey's Grammy winning Triumph album. Bobby also worked on the Temptation's Reunion album. In the late 1980s, Bobby Nunn wrote and produced the 1988 top 5, Grammy nominated  hit song "Rocket 2U" for the Jets.

Discography

Albums

Singles

References

External links
 

1952 births
Living people
20th-century African-American male singers
American pop pianists
American male pianists
American record producers
American soul musicians
Motown artists
American pop keyboardists
American rhythm and blues keyboardists
American funk keyboardists
American soul keyboardists
American funk musicians
American funk singers
American soul singers
American rhythm and blues singers
21st-century American pianists
21st-century American male musicians
African-American pianists
21st-century African-American musicians